Chalengdar (also Romanized as Chalengdār and Jelengedār) is a village in Baraghan Rural District, Chendar District, Savojbolagh County, Alborz Province, Iran. At the 2006 census, its population was 78, in 32 families.

References 

Populated places in Savojbolagh County